Paul (secular name Trofim Meletiev, 2 (15) November 1880, Arkhangelsk - 19 May 1962, Brussels) - Bishop of the Catholic Church. Prior to 1946 - Bishop Roslavl, vicar of the diocese of Smolensk Belarusian Orthodox Church (to the jurisdiction of the Russian Orthodox Church).

Education
Born into the family deacon. He graduated from the seminary Arkhangelsk, Arkhangelsk Theological Seminary (1903). Later, he recalled this period in his life:

"Every year, I spent a vacation in the monastery. There I lived in an atmosphere of prayer and penance. This austere life of the monks are very attracted to me, and every year I gladly returned to it. This opportunity to live among them, those days spent with them in a monastery and a prayer, it was for me a source of great happiness."

Service in the North
Since 1903, he was a novice in the Holy Transfiguration Monastery Solovetsky, there was tonsured. From 1908 - ierodiakon from 1910 - Fr. Exam for teacher training courses at St. Petersburg School District. Since 1916 - Superior, was a missionary diocese in the Far North. He recalled that:

Wanderers took his stick and began to visit the town after town, village to village, preaching the North bypassing Russia. I had to oblige that, to protect the faithful from lukewarmness and indifference in the faith from unbelief and atheism.

Actively opposed the Bolshevik government during the Civil War, published his "Bolshevism before the court of Divine Truth."

Arrest, prison camp

In 1920, there was a missionary trip in the Pinega, where in February the same year, after the occupation troops of the Red Army of the North of Russia, was arrested. Was in custody in Arkhangelsk, in exile, recalled:

Stay in the Bolshevik prison cells very painful, since they are constructed solely to torture and torment the prisoners. Of prisoners shown in absolutely everything, down to the essentials, without which one can not do. The cameras are dark and cheese, so that water flows from the walls, they disgusting with dirt and infested with parasites in them ... terrible to be constantly covered with fleas and bedbugs, always suffer from their bites ... And you can not find any relief from this torture. Every minute you pull the camera back for new interviews, new abuse, insults and abuse.

During the year and two months "the number of the Cheka," as counter-revolutionary. In 1921 was sentenced to death the revolutionary tribunal, which was commuted to 20 years imprisonment, the sentence was reduced to five years of strict isolation. In prison, subjected to new challenges:

Members of the clergy working in the prison seemed exhausting and humiliating. Drove us to the excavation, digging ditches, the water drives the purpose to make fun of us. In the spring of standing knee-deep in cold water and dig a ditch - is sheer torture.

In 1925 was released some time in Moscow, where he helped the bishops Joasaph (Shishkov, Drelevskomu) and Peacock (Kroshechkinu). He was engaged in missionary work in Moscow, Kaluga, Serpukhov. He served in the Kazan Cathedral Church of the Kaluga diocese. In 1931 was arrested again and sentenced to seven years imprisonment in Kazakhstan. In 1937 Meletiou was released.

Secret service

From 1937 to 1941 Meletiev lived in hiding:

"it was a life of constant anxiety, constant hardship and persecution. Nobody wanted to take me, no one wanted to give me shelter for the night. When at my good fortune, some kind and compassionate soul I took, she suffered from fear and anxiety."

Activities during the Second World War
After the outbreak of World War II legalized in German-occupied territory. In one thousand nine hundred and forty-one - one thousand nine hundred forty-three years he served in Smolensk, Bryansk and Mogilev regions, has been elevated to the rank of Archimandrite.

On 12 July 1943 - Bishop Roslavl, vicar of the diocese of Smolensk. His department was in the city of Bryansk. Meletiev was a member of the Belarusian Orthodox Church, which recognized the jurisdiction of the Russian Orthodox Church. With him in the Bryansk region was opened 67 churches, began teaching children and adults, the law of God.

After the Soviet offensive was evacuated in Mogilev, then lived in Czechoslovakia, Austria, Germany. Established links with the Russian Orthodox Church Outside Russia, but its leaders refused to help him - he barely managed to get a temporary residence in the pantry Protection Church in Vienna. According to some, not long occupied the chair of the Vienna ROCOR. In this difficult situation, the refugee bishop helped Catholic Bishop of Regensburg Michael Buchberger.

Catholic bishop

In the summer of 1946 along with her sister Abbess Serafima (Meletieva) joined the Catholic Church. From 1946 turned a Catholic titular bishop of the Eastern Rite. Its scope has been responsible for pastoral care of Catholic communities in the Russian Western Europe. To this end, he traveled, visiting temples, made of worship, consecrated the new church, supplied the new priests, preached.

From 1948 he lived in Belgium : first in the monastery Sheveton, and with 1951 - in Brussels, where he took an active part in the work of the Russian Catholic Centre, served in the house church, worked with Kornievskim and Russian Catholic publishing house, "Life with God." In 1950, the Paris bulletin "Our parish" gave this description of Bishop Paul:

Lord of producing surprisingly bright impression. Despite many years of severe suffering, his eyes full of gentleness, humility and forgiveness. Serves as the lord fervently, strictly following the constitution ... the main difficulty is the lord of relentless prayer feat. We can say that Bishop Paul has, in every sense of the word, the great gift of prayer.

He participated in the Russian Congress of Catholic clergy in Rome in 1950, the Congress of Russian Catholics in Brussels in 1956. During the celebration of his 75th birthday said that:

once seriously thought about my perfect pitch for reunification with the Roman Church and came to the conclusion that he had acted correctly, my conscience is calm, peace and joy in the Lord, reign in my soul.

In January 1962 was adopted in Rome by Pope John XXIII. On 19 May 1962 was hit by a car near the house where he lived. His funeral service was committed to the Church of the Holy Cross in Belgium. He was buried in the cemetery Woluwe-Saint-Pierre next to his sister.

Works

The path of my ministry: Memories of his experiences in the Soviet Union / / Russian Catholic Herald. 1951, No. 4, 1952, No. 1.  Russia and the Universal Church, 1955, No. 2 (26)., 1956, No. 1 (29), 1957, No. 2 (34), 6 (38), 1960, No. 5 (48), 1962, No. 4 (57).

References

 Vladimir Kolupaev. Bishop Paul / Meletiev / (1880–1962)

People from Arkhangelsk
Converts to Eastern Catholicism from Eastern Orthodoxy
Russian Eastern Catholics
Former Russian Orthodox Christians
1880 births
1962 deaths